Dragan Holcer (19 January 1945 – 23 September 2015) was a Yugoslav footballer who played as a defender.

Holcer was born in captivity in a Nazi prison camp to Slovenian father Franc Holcer and Austrian mother Ida Orelli of mixed Austrian-Italian descent who lived in Niš. His father fought in World War II as part of Yugoslav Partisans. His father was killed in battle while his pregnant mother was rounded up in Slovenia and imprisoned in Nazi Germany along with her three daughters. Shortly after the war ended his mother took the family to her hometown Niš in Serbia where Holcer grew up.

International career
He made his debut for Yugoslavia in a September 1965 World Cup qualification match away against Luxembourg and earned a total of 52 caps, scoring no goals. He was a participant at Euro 1968 and his final international was an April 1974 friendly match against the Soviet Union.

Death
Holcer, who was considered to be a legend of Hajduk Split, died in Split on 23 September 2015, aged 70.

References

External links
 

 Serbian national football team website 

1945 births
2015 deaths
Sportspeople from Niš
Croatian people of Slovenian descent
Croatian people of Italian descent
Slovenian people of Italian descent
Association football defenders
Yugoslav footballers
Yugoslavia international footballers
UEFA Euro 1968 players
FK Radnički Niš players
HNK Hajduk Split players
VfB Stuttgart players
FC Schalke 04 players
Yugoslav First League players
Bundesliga players
2. Bundesliga players
Yugoslav expatriate footballers
Expatriate footballers in West Germany
Yugoslav expatriate sportspeople in West Germany
Burials at Lovrinac Cemetery